Sparkle 3 Genesis (stylized as The Sparkle³ genesis) is an arcade video game. It is the second title in 's Sparkle series of video games and the successor of the 2011 video game Sparkle 2 Evo and the predecessor of the 2016 video game Sparkle Zero.

Development 
Sparkle 3 Genesis was developed by Madman Theory Games in collaboration with Plastic Games and published by Polish video game development studio  on April 24, 2015 for Microsoft Windows, macOS, and Linux. The game was ported to Nintendo Switch and released on March 15, 2018 in the west and on September 26, 2019 in Japan.

Gameplay 
The gameplay of Sparkle 3 Genesis is very similar to that of its predecessor. In the game, the player controls the title creature, a microorganism as it swims through something fluid. It can eat food which influences how it will evolve and attack enemies with its teeth. The more it eats, the farther it will evolve. The goal of the game is to involve as far as possible. New compared to its predecessor are missions the player can do.

Reception 
Sparkle 3 Genesis received average reviews, criticizing its simplicity and praising its graphics.German online video game magazine ntower gave the game 5 out of 10 points, and wrote:  "[...] Das Gameplay ist extrem simpel gehalten, im Gegensatz zum Vorgänger gibt es jedoch immerhin kleinere Missionen. Visuell ist Sparkle 3 Genesis recht ansprechend und dient vor allem Dingen einem Zweck: Sich zu entspannen. [...]" (" [...] The gameplay is extremely simple, however, in contrast to the predecessor, there are at least small missions. Visually, Sparkle 3 Genesis is quite appealing and serves one purpose above all: to relax. [...]").

Online video game magazine switchplayer.net gave the game 2.5 out of 5 stars, and wrote: "[The game] is a kind of contemplative experience that puts you in control of an ever-evolving creature. Unfortunately, it lacks variety and sounds more like a mini-game stretched out to become longer and, consequently, tedious."

External links 

 Sparkle 3 on www.nintendo.com

References 

2015 video games
Action video games
Evolution in popular culture
Forever Entertainment games
Linux games
MacOS games
Nintendo Switch games
Single-player video games
Video games about microbes
Video games developed in Poland
Windows games